Leon Lee (born December 4, 1952, in Sacramento, California) is a former professional baseball player and manager, primarily known for his career in Japan. He played first base, third base, and catcher during his career, batting and throwing right-handed. Lee had a ten-year career in Nippon Professional Baseball (NPB). At the conclusion of his playing career, he was considered one of the greatest foreign players to have played in the NPB. Later, he became the first African-American manager in Japanese baseball history.

He is the father of former MLB player Derrek Lee and the brother of former MLB player Leron Lee.

Career

American baseball career 
Leon Lee was selected in the ninth round (198th overall) by the St. Louis Cardinals in the 1971 draft. He spent seven years in the Cardinals' minor league system without playing in a Major League Baseball (MLB) game.

Japanese baseball career 
With the support of his older brother, former American Major League player Leron Lee, who was playing for the Lotte Orions, a Nippon Professional Baseball (NPB) team, Leon was able to make the move to Japan. Lee played five seasons alongside his older brother, hitting 41 home runs, 116 RBIs, with a .340 batting average in 1980. His batting average that year was the second-highest in the Pacific League, behind his brother's average.

Lee was traded to the Yokohama Taiyo Whales where he played from 1983 to 1985. He finished his career in Japan with the Yakult Swallows from 1986 to 1987 before returning to the United States.

Scouting and managing 
His past experience in Japan helped him become the Pacific Rim scout for the Chicago Cubs in 1998.

After the 2002 MLB season, Lee left the Cubs and returned to Japan to serve as the Orix BlueWave's hitting coach for the 2003 NPB season. The manager, Hiromichi Ishige, was fired in April, and Lee was promoted to manager, becoming the first African-American manager in Japanese baseball history. On May 17, 2003, the BlueWave faced the Nippon Ham Fighters, managed by Trey Hillman, for a battle between two American managers in Japan for the first time in 28 years. The Blue Waves were a good offensive team, but the pitching staff posted a 5.95 team ERA, and the team finished in last place with a 48-88-4 record. The club hired a Japanese manager for the next season and Lee was offered, but declined, the hitting coach position.

Brooklyn Cyclones 
In February 2004, Lee was hired to manage the Brooklyn Cyclones, a Class-A New York Mets minor-league affiliate. On April 8, he was arrested  for indecent exposure in a hotel after seeking to quiet a noisy late-night crowd that was disturbing his team. While the charges were still pending, he was forced to resign before managing his first game. Although Lee pressed for a court date to clear his name, the charges were dropped in 2005.

Sacramento Stealth
In 2016, he became owner of the Sacramento Stealth of the new collegiate wood bat Great West League.

References

External links

 English article on Leon Lee

1952 births
Living people
Baseball players from Bakersfield, California
African-American baseball players
African-American baseball managers
African-American baseball coaches
American expatriate baseball players in Japan
Chicago Cubs scouts
Lotte Orions players
Yokohama Taiyō Whales players
Yakult Swallows players
Expatriate baseball managers in Japan
Managers of baseball teams in Japan
Orix BlueWave managers
21st-century African-American people
20th-century African-American sportspeople